Bay Township is one of the twelve townships of Ottawa County, Ohio, United States.  The 2000 census found 1,294 people in the unincorporated portions of the township.

Geography
Located in the southern part of the county along Sandusky Bay, it borders the following townships:
Erie Township - north
Portage Township - east
Margaretta Township, Erie County - southeast corner, across Sandusky Bay
Riley Township, Sandusky County - south, across Sandusky Bay
Rice Township, Sandusky County - southwest corner, across Sandusky Bay
Salem Township - west

A small part of the city of Port Clinton, the county seat of Ottawa County, is located in the northeastern corner of Bay Township.

The Portage River forms the border with Erie Township

Name and history
It is the only Bay Township statewide.

Government
The township is governed by a three-member board of trustees, who are elected in November of odd-numbered years to a four-year term beginning on the following January 1. Two are elected in the year after the presidential election and one is elected in the year before it. There is also an elected township fiscal officer, who serves a four-year term beginning on April 1 of the year after the election, which is held in November of the year before the presidential election. Vacancies in the fiscal officership or on the board of trustees are filled by the remaining trustees.

References

External links
County website

Townships in Ottawa County, Ohio
Townships in Ohio